Run Boy Run may refer to:

 Run Boy Run (film), a 2013 German-French-Polish co-production
 Run Boy Run (band), a progressive bluegrass band
 "Run Boy Run" (song), a 2012 single by Woodkid